Top o' the Morning is a lost 1922 silent film romantic drama directed by Edward Laemmle and starring Gladys Walton. It was produced and distributed by Universal Film Manufacturing Company.

Plot
As described in a film magazine, Geraldine "Jerry" O'Donnell (Walton), a winsome Irish colleen, is happy at the thought that she will soon visit her father and brother in America, but once there she finds her stepmother making her life unbearable, and she decides to run away. After leaving a farewell note to her father, she accidentally meets young American banker John Garland (Myers), who remembers her from the previous summer as a lass of Old Ireland. Learning of her plight, he offers to take her into his home as a governess to his little daughter Dot (Turner), who has adored Jerry since meeting her in County Kerry. Separated from her father, afraid that her brother may be sent to prison for a crime he did not commit, and having few of the stuff of which happiness is made, Jerry learns about life. She eventually becomes an American girl and wife.

Cast
Gladys Walton as "Jerry" O'Donnell
Harry Myers as John Garland
Doreen Turner as Dot Garland
Florence D. Lee as Jerry's Aunt
William Welsh as Dermott O'Donnell
Don Bailey as Mulrooney
Richard Henry Cummings as Father Quinn (credited as Dick Cummings)
Margaret Campbell as Mrs. O'Donnell
Ralph McCullough as Eugene O'Donnell
Ethel Shannon as Katherine Vincent
Harry Carter as Blakely Stone
William Moran as Thomas Wilson
Sally Russell as Katie McDougal
Martha Mattox as Miss Murdock

References

External links

1922 films
American silent feature films
Lost American films
Films directed by Edward Laemmle
Universal Pictures films
American films based on plays
American black-and-white films
American romantic drama films
1922 romantic drama films
1920s American films
Silent romantic drama films
Silent American drama films